Instruktsiya po vyzhivaniyu (Instructions for Survival) is the 17th album by the Russian punk band Grazhdanskaya Oborona, released in 1990. It was their final album before their break up a week later (they played their final concert in Tallinn on the 13th of April, 9 days after the album was mixed), but they reformed in 1993.

The album's songs are covers of songs by the band Instruktsiya po Vyzhivaniyu. The songs were written between 1986 and 1989. After IPV's lead singer Roman Neumoev converted to Christianity, he gave the songs to Letov, telling him he could use them in whatever way he wanted. Letov decided to record a tribute to IPV using these songs.

The LP issue in 2013 has 5 bonus tracks taken from these sessions and the sessions for the Egor i Opizdenevshie album Pryg-skok. In 2016, it was released on CD by Bull Terrier Records, including two extra bonus tracks.

The album has two different renditions of "Posvyashchenie A. Kruchonkyh" and "Nepreryvny suicid". Track 2 was sung by Igor Zhevtun, while track 12 was sung by Egor Letov. The two versions of the song differ in the first line of the final verse - the word "menty" (cops) in the line "Я подамся в менты, в педерасты, в поэты, в монахи" (I'll become a cop, a queer, a poet, a monk) on track 2 was changed to "zhidy" (kikes) on track 12.

Track list

Personnel 
 Igor "Jeff" Zhevtun - guitar, vocals, backing vocals
 Yegor Letov – vocals, guitars, bass guitar, drums, production
 Konstantin "Kuzya UO" Ryabinov - keyboards, saxophone, backing vocals

Legacy 
In 2008, shortly before his death, Letov answered a fan's question on the GrOb website, saying the album would never be reissued, stating "there is no such album". However, his widow Natalia Chumakova remastered the album in late 2011. The remaster was reissued on double vinyl in 2013 by Neuro Empire.

The remaster was also remixed: changes include a missing stick hit from the beginning of "Nepreryvnyy suitsid" (track 1) being restored, the fade out of the final chord in "Moya severnaya strana" having some laughter from Letov added, the feedback in the beginning of "Rodina-Smert'" starting up straight away instead of fading in and "Khuy" being slower (presumably the original speed of the song) and ending slightly differently.

5 bonus tracks were also included, among them being the original Egor i Opizdenevshie version of "Krasny smekh", recorded in 1990 and released on vinyl and CD on BSA, but being left off the 2006 CD reissue of Pryg-skok for the same copyright reasons precluding this album's reissue. The original version on the album was faded out, however this version had the natural ending of the song. The version of "Nepreryvnyy suitsid" recorded for Pryg-skok under the title "Pro malinovuyu devochku" was not included, however it would be on the CD release of the remaster three years later.

Zhevtun, who substituted for Letov on two tracks due to the similarity between their voices, participated in GrOb's 35th anniversary reunion tour in 2019 as lead vocalist and guitarist.

References

External links 
 Instruktsiya po vyzhivaniyu at Discogs (list of versions)
 Instruktsiya po vyzhivaniyu on GrOb's official website

1990 albums
Grazhdanskaya Oborona albums
Tribute albums
Concept albums